Pavel Gennadyevich Ignatovich (born 24 May 1989) is a Russian football player.

Career 
The promising youngster who is known for his pace and dribbling ability, Ignatovich joined Zenit Reserves in 2007 at the age of 17. He made his debut for the first team on 20 August 2009, coming as a substitute in UEFA Europa League game against Portuguese side C.D. Nacional de Madeira. He made an instant impact and scored almost immediately, only for the goal to be disallowed for offside.

Despite finishing as Reserves tournament top scorer in 2009, he hadn't been registered for the club in 2010.

In July 2010 he was loaned to D1 club Khimki until the end of the season.

In July 2012 he signed a two-year contract with FC Amkar Perm. He made his Russian Premier League debut for Amkar on 12 August 2012 in a game against FC Mordovia Saransk.

Personal life
He is a son of former Zenit Leningrad defender Gennady Ignatovich.

External links
  Profile at the official FC Zenit St. Petersburg website
 

1989 births
Footballers from Saint Petersburg
Living people
Russian footballers
Russia youth international footballers
Russia under-21 international footballers
FC Zenit Saint Petersburg players
FC Khimki players
FC Amkar Perm players
FC Dynamo Moscow players
FC Tom Tomsk players
Russian Premier League players
Cypriot First Division players
FC Mordovia Saransk players
Ermis Aradippou FC players
Russian expatriate footballers
Expatriate footballers in Cyprus
Russian expatriate sportspeople in Cyprus
Association football midfielders
FC Tambov players
FC Nizhny Novgorod (2015) players
FC Dynamo Bryansk players
FC Shinnik Yaroslavl players